Taif is a city and governorate in the Makkah Region of Saudi Arabia.

There is a belief that Taif is indirectly referred to in Quran 43:31. The city was visited by the Islamic prophet Muhammad, sometime in the early 7th century, and was inhabited by the tribe of Banu Thaqif. It is still inhabited to this day by their descendants. As a part of the Hejaz, the city has seen many transfers-of-power throughout its history, with the last being during the Saudi conquest of Hejaz in 1925.

The city has been called the unofficial summer capital of Saudi Arabia and has also been called the best summer destination in Saudi Arabia as it enjoys a moderate weather during summer, unlike most of the Arabian Peninsula. The city owes its popularity among tourists to its many mountain resorts and moderate climate, even during the harsh summers of Arabia. The city is connected to the nearby resort town of Al-Hada via the iconic Highway 15 (Taif – Al-Hada Road). It stands out from the rest of the Hijazi region as it is a city that plays an active role in the agricultural output of Saudi Arabia and is the center of an agricultural area known for its cultivation of grapes, pomegranate, figs, roses and honey. Taif is also very active in the manufacturing of traditional 'Ittar, and is known locally as "City of the Roses". Taif also hosts the historic Souq 'Okaz.

The Taif governorate is divided into 15 smaller municipalities, with Ta'if as the capital. The administration of the city itself is carried out by 5 municipalities, named North Taif, West Taif, East Taif, South Taif and New Taif. Taif is served by the Taif Regional Airport, with a new international airport planned to open sometime in 2020.

Name 
Much like many of the cities in the Hejazi region, the city of Ta'if had an older name: Wajj. This was also the name of the Valley of Wajj, a significant valley within Arabian and Islamic history.

The etymology of the city's current name, Taʾif, comes from the Arabic root , which could translate to "wanderer", "roamer", or "circulator"; the latter of which is the basis of the word Ṭawāf, which literally translates to "circulation" or "circumambulation", and is used in the context of the circumambulation of the Kaaba.

Taʾif was given this name due to the wall that was built by the tribe of Banu Thaqif that circulated the city. In short, the city of Taʾif literally means the circulated or encircled city.

History 

In the 6th century A.D., the city of Ta'if was dominated by the Thaqif tribe, which still lives in and around the city of Ta'if today. It has been suggested that Jewish tribes who were displaced by Ethiopian Christians in the Himyarite Kingdom wars settled near Ta'if. The walled city was a religious centre as it housed the idol of the goddess Lāt, who was then known as "the lady of Ta'if." Its climate marked the city out from its dry and barren neighbours closer to the Red Sea. Wheat, vines and fruit orchards were grown around Ta'if, and this is how the city earned its title "the Garden of the Hejaz." Both Ta'if and Mecca were resorts of pilgrimage. Ta'if was more pleasantly situated than Mecca itself, and their people of Ta'if had close trading relations. The people of Ta'if carried on agriculture and fruit‑growing in addition to their trade activities.

In the early 7th century, Muhammad, who was born in Makkah, preached Islam to the inhabitants of Mecca and the Hijaz, and encountered resistance from many of the people there. In 630, a battle took place at Hunayn, close to the city. Shortly after that, the unsuccessful siege of Ta'if took place. The city was assaulted by catapults from Banu Daus, but it repelled the attacks. The Battle of Tabuk in 631 left Tā'if completely isolated, so members of Thaqīf arrived in Makkah to negotiate the conversion of the city to Islam. The idol of Lāt was destroyed along with all other signs of the city's pagan past.

The city then went through many exchanges-of-power, but most of the action within these conflicts took place between Makkah and Medina, and Ta'if dwindled in importance in contrast to the two holy cities.

Under Ottoman rule 
On 17 July 1517, the Sharif of Mecca capitulated to the Ottoman Sultan Selim I. As a sign of this, he surrendered to him the keys of the Islamic cities of Mecca and Medina. As part of the Hijaz, Ta'if was also given over to Ottoman control and the city remained Ottoman for a further three centuries, until in 1802, when it was retaken by rebels allied with the House of Saud. These forces then proceeded to take Mecca and Medina. The loss was keenly felt by the Ottoman Empire, which viewed itself as the protector of the holy cities. The Ottoman sultan, Mahmud II, called upon the Wali of Egypt, Muhammad Ali, who launched an attack on the Hejaz and reconquered Ta'if in 1813.

In 1813, the Swiss traveler and orientalist Johann Ludwig Burckhardt visited Ta'if and left an eyewitness account of the city just after its recapture by the Muhammad Ali, with whom he obtained several interviews while he was there. Burckhardt reported that the wall and ditch around the city had been built by Othman el-Medhayfe. Burckhardt stated that the castle had been built by Sharif Ghalib ibn Musa'id. He noted the destruction of the city caused by the conquest of 1802. Most of the buildings were still in ruin while he was there, and the tomb of 'Abdullah ibn 'Abbas – cousin of Muhammad and ancestor of the Abbasids – had been severely damaged. He also recorded that the population of the city was still mostly Thaqīfi. In terms of trade, the city was an entrepôt for coffee.

The castle and military barracks in Ta'if were repaired by the Ottomans in 1843, a  – mansion for government business – was built in 1869, and a post office was established sometime later.

Arab Revolt 

Prior to the Arab Revolt, Ahmed Bey had been made the commander of Ottoman forces in Tā'if. He had under him a force of 3,000 soldiers and 10 pieces of mountain artillery. Ghalib Pasha, the governor of the Hejaz was also present in the city. In 1916, the Hashemites launched their revolt against the Ottoman Empire in Mecca in June. That city had fallen and then in July, Abdullah, the eldest son of the Hashemite leader and Sharif of Mecca, Husayn ibn Ali, came with seventy men to Tā'if. Whilst his activities in the area aroused the suspicion of Ahmed Bey, Ghalib Pasha was unconcerned by so small a force. Abdullah secretly built up his army to 5,000 men. He then cut the telegraph wires to the city and took the offensive. All Hashemite assaults on the city were repelled by the mountain guns, and both sides settled down to an uneasy siege. However, Hashemite guns were slowly brought up to Tā'if, and then the city held out a little longer; before finally surrendering on 22 September. The city thus later became a part of the self-proclaimed Hashemite Kingdom of Hejaz.

Saudi conquest and modern history 
Ta'if did not remain in Hashemite hands for very long. Tensions between the King of the Hejaz, Husayn ibn Ali, and Abdulaziz al-Saud, the Emir of Nejd and Hasa, soon broke out into violence. Although hostilities subsided in 1919, by September 1924, the then Saudi-sponsored Ikhwan militia, under the leadership of Sultan bin Bajad and Khaled bin Luwai', was ready to attack Ta'if. The city was supposed to have been defended by the king's son, 'Ali, but he fled in panic with his troops. Three hundred of 'Ali's men were slain by the Ikhwan in what became known as the Ta'if massacre. In 1926, Abdulaziz al-Saud was officially recognized as the new King of Hejaz. Ta'if remained a part of the Kingdom of Hejaz until Abdulaziz al-Saud unified his two kingdoms and consolidated them into the Kingdom of Saudi Arabia in 1932. In 1934 the treaty was signed here that established the boundary lines between Yemen and the kingdom. The king himself was later to die in the city on 9 November 1953, as did King Khalid on 13 June 1982.

Ta'if was still little more than a medieval city when the Saudis took control of it. However, they later embarked on a project of modernizing the city. Saudi Arabia's first public power generator was set up in Ta'if in the late 1940s. In terms of building roads to the isolated city, in 1965 the then King Faisal inaugurated the  mountain highway between Mecca and Ta'if, now part of Highway 15 and known as the Taif – Al-Hada Road. In 1974, the approximately-650-kilometer Ta'if-Abha–Jizan highway was commissioned part of the Highway 15. By the 1991 Gulf War, Ta'if was such a modern city in terms of communications that it was chosen as the site of the Rendon Group's television and radio network, which was used for communication with Kuwait during the Iraqi occupation.

Geography 

The entirety of the Ta'if governorate is situated on a raised valley surrounded by the Hejaz Mountains (part of the Sarat mountains) to the west and south. Ta'if is known to have had many wadis with running water before, suggested by the presence of dams along many of these.Taif's highest point, the Jebel Daka is even the fifth highest peak of Saudi Arabia.

Climate 
Ta'if has a hot desert climate (Köppen climate classification BWh), with hot summers and mild winters. Temperatures are not as extreme in summer as for lower-lying regions of Saudi Arabia. It is much cooler in Ta'if during the summertime than it is other parts of Saudi Arabia, particularly Riyadh. Precipitation is low, but all months see some rain, with more rain in spring and late autumn than in other months.

Economy and development 

Historically, Ta'if's economy depended on agriculture and the cultivation of roses, which were traded throughout Central Asia and Transoxiana. Ta'if's modern economy is still mostly dependent on agriculture and perfumes, but an increasing diversification project has been taking place in order to combat the city's heavy dependence on these two industries. The distilled rose oil from the Rosa × damascena plant has been traditionally used as an 'ittar in the Middle East, usually as a masculine fragrance, and due to its cultivation in Ta'if, it has gained the name "Ta'if rose."

On October 1, 2017, King Salman of Saudi Arabia inaugurated the "New Ta'if" project, a $3.9 billion project aiming at establishing a new, international airport in the city, dubbed the Ta'if International Airport, renovation and modernization of the historic Souk 'Okaz, establishment of the Oasis of Technology, which is expected to include an Antonov aircraft manufacturing and assembly plant, an industrial airport with a 3.5-km runway, a solar farm covering  expected to produce 30 MW of electricity, the Residential Suburb, which is expected to include 10,000 residential units, the Industrial City, an  industrial city with a complex for heavy, medium and light industries along with a vocational training center, and the University City, a  university projected to be built in the Saiysad National Park.

Culture

Natural landmarks 
Al Rudaf Park is a large natural park in South Ta'if, where trees stand amidst weathered granite rocks. The site also has a small zoo. Additionally, the park has a large lake with fountains and cannons. The Ta'if rose plantation is a complex of rose fields filled with small fragrant pink roses that are distilled into expensive Ta'if rose oil. The famous grown here is the 30-petal Damask rose (Rosa damascena trigintipetala), whose scent has been described as a robust, spicy, and dizzyingly complex scent which has been used by several luxury perfume brands, including Ormonde Jayne, Chanel, Guerlain and Hermès. The fruit gardens of Ta'if are located here. A camel ride is available, and Jabal Dakka is within view of the village. The Saiysad National Park is located in New Ta’if.

 Museums and historic landmarks 

The souq was a scene of annual social, political and commercial gatherings. It was also the location of competitive recitation of poetry and prose. The buildings remain, including prominent outlines of walls of basaltic stone. Wadi Mitna is a wadi believed to be the location where Muhammad sought refuge from the tribes of Hawazin and Thaqif in 619 AD, after he was stoned by the tribes. He was later given sanctuary by his fellows in a small house, which has now been converted into a mosque. Shubra Palace is the regional museum of Ta'if, housed in a building built around 1900, which served as Ibn Saud's lodging in the 1930s, and was also used as the Presidency of the Council of Ministers of Saudi Arabia during King Faisal's reign. The Turkish Fort was a fort located near the Souk 'Okaz, many battles have been fought here and many prominent graves can be found, though only a small part of the original fort remains. Legend has it that Lawrence of Arabia also fought here. The Badawi Fortress is located in the southern reaches of East Ta’if.

 Arts 
The Souk 'Okaz, one of the best known pre-Islamic souks, was not only a market, but in many ways, a historic theater, where sociopolitical and commercial exchanges took place between the tribes of pre-Islamic Arabia. People from around the peninsula would come to visit the idol of the goddess Lat. This is proof that Ta'if has long been a historic center for trade and the arts in the Arabian Peninsula; contemporary theaters in the area include the 'Okaz Market Theater and the recently opened King 'Abdullah Park Theater. A performing arts theater is also located in the nearby town of Qia and is known as the Folk Theater of Qia.

In the framework of Saudi Seasons initiative, the first Ta'if Season took place on August 1, 2019. Artists from 7 countries participated in the event and a wide range of activities were overseen. Three main events have taken place during the season including the Souk 'Okaz festival and a camel race. As a sideline to the event, a rose festival in the city as well as a number of concerts and plays were held.

 Sports 
Like most of Saudi Arabia, the most popular sport among Saudis in Ta'if is football. The Wej SC (Saudi Arabian Football Federation) plays at the King Fahd Sports City in North Ta'if near as-Sayl as-Saghir and is the football team representing the city. The expatriate minority in the city has brought several other games with them to Ta'if, including cricket, badminton and volleyball.

 Transportation 

Due to Ta'if's location in the mountains, most major highways either bend around the city or avoid the region completely. The only major highway in the Saudi Arabian network to pass through Ta'if is Highway 15 (known to locals as the Taif – Al-Hada Road) which arrives from Mecca in the west, bends around the mountains through Al-Hada, passes through the center of Ta'if, and travels to Abha and Khamis Mushait via Baha and Baljurashi. Ta'if is connected to Highway 40 via Highway 267 and Highway 287. Highway 267 forms the western part of the Ta'if beltway, but then continues southward toward Ash-Shafa, bypassing Mecca by using a longer route and gives access to Highway 304, Highway 301, Highway 40 and Highway 290 via Highway 298.

Ta'if is served by the Taif International Airport. It was scheduled to open in 2020, but this had been delayed due to the COVID-19 pandemic. The new airport is mainly designed to cater to pilgrims of Hajj and 'Umrah, and to relieve pressure off the King Abdulaziz International Airport in Jeddah.

 Famous people 

 Tribes 

The historically well-known tribe of Thaqif still lives in and around the city of Ta'if. ‘Utaibah is another Adnani tribe which still lives in Ta'if. Banu Harith is one of the Qahtani Arabs tribes living around Ta'if in Saudi Arabia. The tribe claims a very large area around the city in the area between Ta'if and Qunfudhah in Saudi Arabia. Thu al-Isba' al-'Adwani was an Arabic poet and a man of wisdom from the Banu 'Adwan tribe that historically lived in the northern parts of Ta'if. Furthermore, Banu Thabit are people descended from Thabit and the tribe is originally part of Hawazin clan.

 Births in the pre-modern era Pre-Islamic leaders of Banu ThaqifDuring the pre-Islamic era, the city was populated by the tribe of Thaqif. The city had then the following chieftains:
 'Urwah ibn Mas'ud
 'Abd-ya-Layl ibn 'Amr
 'Uthman ibn Abu al-'AasOther important Islamic figures 'Uthman ibn 'Affan (579–656) — 3rd Rashidun Caliph and son-in-law of Muhammad
 Al-Hajjaj ibn Yusuf (661–714) — Umayyad-era Governor of Iraq and general
 Muhammad bin Qasim (695–715) — Umayyad general who conquered the Sindh and Punjab regions along the Indus River.
 Al-Hurr ibn Abd al-Rahman Fourth ruler of Al-Andalus during the Umayyad rule
 Sharif Ali ibn Ajlan ibn Rumaithah ibn Muhammad, son-in-law and successor of Sultan Ahmad of Brunei, father of Sultan Sulaiman, and a descendant of Muhammad

 Births in the modern era Monarchs and royals King Faisal I of Iraq (1885-1933) — 20th-century King of Syria and Iraq
 Prince Nayef bin 'Abdulaziz Al Saud (1934–2012) — former Crown Prince and Minister of Interior of Saudi ArabiaOthers'''
 Hadi Soua'an Al-Somaily (1976–present) — First Saudi Olympic medal winner.
 Mutlaq Hamid Al-Otaibi (1937–95) — poet and writer; member of the Faculty of Sharia' at the Umm al-Qura' University 
 Hani Hanjour (1972–2001) — 9/11 hijacker pilot who crashed American Airlines flight 77 into The Pentagon.

 Deaths 
 'Abdullah ibn 'Abbas (619–687) — cousin of Muhammad
 Midhat Pasha (1822–83) — Ottoman grand vizier; assassinated by strangulation in prison
 Ibn Saud (1875–1953) — founder and 1st king of the Third Saudi State, the modern Kingdom of Saudi Arabia
 Khalid of Saudi Arabia (1913–1982) — 4th king of Saudi Arabia and son of Ibn Saud

 Governors 

 See also 
 Al-Kateb House
 Banu Jadhimah
 Miqat'' of Qarnul-Manazil at As Sayl al Kabir
 Ta'if Agreement
 'Utaybah

References

External links 

At-Ta'if
Populated places in Mecca Province